Eamonn Gerard Toal (born in Castleblayney, Ireland) is an Irish singer and showman who performed on Eurovision in 2000 with the song "Millennium of Love". With 92 points, he came in sixth position.

Discography 
Aria Celtica (2000)

References

Sources 
Official site 

Living people
Eurovision Song Contest entrants of 2000
Eurovision Song Contest entrants for Ireland
Irish male singers
Musicians from County Monaghan
Year of birth missing (living people)